Ivan Potekhin (born 8 April 1981 in Dzerzhinsk) is a Russian Paralympic 7-a-side footballer.

Potekhin participated in the 2004, 2008 and 2012 Summer Paralympics.

References

External links
 

1981 births
Living people
Russian footballers
Paralympic 7-a-side football players of Russia
Paralympic gold medalists for Russia
Paralympic silver medalists for Russia
Paralympic bronze medalists for Russia
Paralympic medalists in football 7-a-side
7-a-side footballers at the 2004 Summer Paralympics
7-a-side footballers at the 2008 Summer Paralympics
7-a-side footballers at the 2012 Summer Paralympics
Medalists at the 2004 Summer Paralympics
Medalists at the 2008 Summer Paralympics
Medalists at the 2012 Summer Paralympics
Association footballers not categorized by position
People from Dzerzhinsk, Russia
Sportspeople from Nizhny Novgorod Oblast
21st-century Russian people